Hernandez Valley is an ice-free valley, which is the eastmost of four aligned hanging valleys in the Apocalypse Peaks of Victoria Land. The valley opens north to Barwick Valley opposite Lake Vashka. Named in 2005 by the Advisory Committee on Antarctic Names after Gonzalo J. Hernandez, Department of Earth and Space Sciences, University of Washington, Seattle; United States Antarctic Program high-latitude atmospheric research at Amundsen–Scott and McMurdo Stations; 15 field seasons 1991–2004.

References

Valleys of Victoria Land